Acraea alalonga, the long-winged orange acraea, is a butterfly of the family Nymphalidae. It is found in montane grassland from the Drakensberg and midlands in KwaZulu-Natal, north into Mpumalanga and the Wolkberg in Limpopo.

The wingspan is 54–74 mm for males and 58–74 mm for females. Adults are on wing from November to January (with a peak in December) and from March to May (with a peak in April). There are two generations per year.

The larvae feed on Fabaceae species, including Aeschynomene species.

Taxonomy
It is a member of the Acraea rahira species group-   but see also Pierre & Bernaud, 2014

References

Butterflies described in 1996
alalonga
Endemic butterflies of South Africa